The Dance is the fifth studio album by saxophone player Dave Koz. It was released by Capitol Records on  September 28, 1999. The album peaked at number 2 on the Billboard Top Contemporary Jazz Albums chart. The album sold more than 500,000 copies and was certified gold by the Recording Industry Association of America (RIAA).

Track listing

Personnel 
 Dave Koz – alto saxophone, baritone saxophone, soprano saxophone, tenor saxophone, keyboards, arrangements (5, 13)
 Jeff Koz – keyboards, acoustic guitar, bass, drum programming, arrangements (5, 13), vocal arrangements (14)
 Jeff Lorber – keyboards (2, 11), drum programming (2, 11)
 Carl Sturken – keyboards (3, 8), acoustic guitar (3, 8), electric guitar (3, 8), bass (3, 8), drum programming (3, 8)
 Mark Portmann – additional  keyboards (3), keyboards (8)
 Schappell Crawford – keyboards (4), Fender Rhodes (4)
 David Benoit – string arrangements (4, 6), acoustic piano (6)
 Urs Wiesendanger – additional keyboards (5, 11), percussion (5)
 Glen Ballard – keyboards (9), acoustic piano (9)
 Randy Kerber – Fender Rhodes (9)
 Brad Cole – arrangements (10), additional keyboards (14)
 Burt Bacharach – acoustic piano (12)
 Greg Phillinganes – keyboards (12)
 Michael Thompson – electric guitar (1, 4, 7, 12, 13), nylon guitar (4), guitar (9, 14), acoustic guitar (13)
 Michael Landau – acoustic guitar (2, 11), electric guitar (2, 5, 11)
 Jay Williams – acoustic guitar (4)
 Paul Jackson, Jr. – electric guitar (5)
 Tony Maiden – wah wah guitar (7)
 Marc Antoine – Spanish guitar (8)
 Jonathan Butler – acoustic guitar (11), vocals (11)
 Dean Parks – acoustic guitar (12), electric guitar (12)
 Al McKay – electric guitar (14)
 Bill Sharpe – bass (1, 7)
 Nathan East – bass (2, 11)
 Freddie Washington – bass (6)
 John Peña – bass (8, 14)
 Neil Stubenhaus – bass (12)
 Gota Yashiki – drum samples (1)
 Steve Ferrone – drums (3)
 George Johnson – drums (4)
 Montell Jordan – drum programming (4), lead vocals (4)
 John Robinson – drums (5, 11, 12, 14)
 Ricky Lawson – drums (6)
 Matt Chamberlain – drums (9)
 Vinnie Colaiuta – drums (13)
 Lenny Castro – percussion (1, 3, 6, 7, 12, 13)
 Paulinho da Costa – percussion (2, 5, 11)
 Brian Kilgore – percussion (9)
 Luis Conte – percussion (10)
 Nick Lane – trombone (12)
 Chris Botti – trumpet (5)
 Wayne Bergeron – flugelhorn (12), trumpet (12)
 Bruce Dukov – concertmaster (4, 6)
 Luther Vandross – vocals (3), vocal arrangements (3)
 Sue Ann Carwell – backing vocals (4, 12)
 Shae Jones – backing vocals (4)
 Cindy Mizelle – backing vocals (8)
 Audrey Wheeler – backing vocals (8)
 BeBe Winans – lead vocals (9)
 Gloria Agustus – backing vocals (9)
 Kathy Hazzard – backing vocals (9)
 Janet Mims – backing vocals (9)
 Ricky Nelson – backing vocals (9)
 Alfie Silas – backing vocals (9)
 Jackie Simley Stevens – backing vocals (12)
 Mervyn Warren – lead and backing vocals (14), vocal arrangements (14)
 Terry Bradford – backing vocals (14)
 Timothy Owens – backing vocals  (14)
 David Thomas – backing vocals (14)

Production 
 Roy Lott – executive producer 
 Dave Koz – producer, engineer 
 Jeff Koz – producer, engineer 
 Jeff Lorber – producer (2, 11)
 Evan Rogers – producer (3, 8)
 Carl Sturken – producer (3, 8)
 Schappell Crawford – producer (4)
 Montell Jordan – producer (4)
 Glen Ballard – producer (9)
 Brad Cole – producer (10), engineer
 Scott Campbell – engineer 
 Bryan Carrigan – engineer 
 Anne Catalino – engineer 
 Nick Els – engineer 
 Clark Germain – engineer 
 Al Hemberger – engineer 
 Ed Miller – engineer 
 Gus Mossler – engineer 
 Frank Nadasdy – engineer 
 Doug Rider – engineer 
 Gabe Veltri – engineer 
 John Vigran – engineer 
 Jeff Woodruff – engineer 
 Allen Sides – strings recording (4, 6)
 Peter Mokran – mixing 
 Steve Hall – mastering 
 Valerie Pack – project coordinator 
 Ceinwyn Clark – production coordinator 
 Jolie Levine-Aller – production coordinator 
 Jeffrey Fey – art direction, design 
 Tommy Steele – art direction 
 Sam Jones – photography 
 Adriana Verwey – stylist

Charts

Certifications

References

1999 albums
Dave Koz albums
Capitol Records albums
Instrumental albums